Central High School is a high school in the Phoenix Union High School District, Phoenix, Arizona, United States. The campus is located at 4525 North Central Avenue, just north of downtown. It was established in 1957.

History 
The school was built in 1957. It was designed by noted Phoenix architect John Sing Tang. The construction of the school was completed by Weeks Construction Co. and D. O. Norton & Son Construction Co. both of Phoenix.

Enrollment
, Central’s enrollment was 2,370 students. That year over 60 percent of the population was Hispanic. Central also has the highest percentage of Caucasian students in the district, as well as the highest percentage of Native Americans. Central also is noted for its substantial refugee population, one of the largest in the state.

The school predominantly serves students from partner elementary districts Alhambra, Creighton, Madison, Osborn, and Phoenix Elementary. However, students from across the district come to Central for its Phoenix Union Magnet Program in International Studies. Students zoned to Arthur M. Hamilton School of the Murphy School District, meaning those in the district east of Interstate 17 and north of the Maricopa Freeway, are zoned to Central.

The Arizona Department of Education has designated Central a "performing" school. Central has had 96 students recognized as National Merit Scholars in the past 15 years. The International Studies program includes foreign exchange programs.

Notable alumni

Sports
Trung Canidate – National Football League (NFL) running back
Bryan Colangelo – National Basketball Association executive
Lois Drinkwater – sprinter and the first Arizona female to run in the Olympics (1968 as a junior)
Azur Kamara – NFL defensive end
Damon Mays – NFL wide receiver
Darryl Morrison – NFL safety
Dave Rajsich – Major League Baseball (MLB) player
Jay Schlueter – MLB player

Entertainment and music
Mark Coggins – author
Samantha Ponder – ESPN personality
Richard Page (class of 1971) – lead singer and bassist of the pop rock band Mr. Mister

Politics
Phil Gordon – 58th mayor of Phoenix
Rosanna Gabaldón – member of the Arizona House of Representatives

Other
Ian Bruce (class of 1962) – professor and vice-president of the Royal National Institute of Blind People (RNIB)
Cindy McCain – American businesswoman, philanthropist, humanitarian, special educator, and author

References

External links
 Central High School
 Arizona Department of Education School Report Card

Public high schools in Arizona
High schools in Phoenix, Arizona
1957 establishments in Arizona
Educational institutions established in 1957